Evolocumab (trade name Repatha) is a monoclonal antibody medication designed for the treatment of hyperlipidemia.

Evolocumab is a fully human monoclonal antibody that inhibits proprotein convertase subtilisin/kexin type 9 (PCSK9). PCSK9 is a protein that targets LDL receptors for degradation and its inhibition thereby enhances the liver's ability to remove LDL-C, or "bad" cholesterol, from the blood.

Mechanism
Evolocumab is designed to bind to PCSK9 and inhibit PCSK9 from binding to LDL receptors on the liver surface. In the absence of PCSK9, there are more LDL receptors on the surface of liver cells to remove LDL-C from the blood.

History
Amgen submitted a biologics license application (BLA) for evolocumab to the FDA in August 2014. The FDA approved evolocumab injection on 27 August 2015, for some patients who are unable to get their LDL cholesterol under control with current treatment options. The European Commission approved it in July 2015. Evolocumab received approval from Health Canada on September 10, 2015. Amgen reported approval by Health Canada in a press release on September 15, 2015.

Regeneron Pharmaceuticals and Amgen had each filed for patent protection on their monoclonal antibodies against PCSK9 and the companies ended up in patent litigation in the U.S.  In March 2016 a district court found that Regeneron's drug alirocumab infringed Amgen's patents; Amgen then requested an injunction barring Regeneron and Sanofi from marketing alirocumab, which was granted in January 2017. The judge gave Regeneron and Sanofi 30 days to appeal before the injunction went into effect.

Results of the FOURIER trial were published in March 2017.

Society and culture

Economics 
In 2015 it cost about US$14,100 per year. One article calculated this to be about $400,000 to $500,000 per quality-adjusted life year (QALY), which did not meet "generally accepted" cost-benefit thresholds. The authors calculated that an annual cost of $4,500 would meet an acceptable $100,000 per QALY standard. On October 26, 2018 the maker of the drug, Amgen, announced a 60% cut in price and the drug now costs $5,850 per year.

References

External links 
 

Amgen
PCSK9 inhibitors
Monoclonal antibodies